Young Seven is an Australian television series which aired 1957 to 1960 on Melbourne station HSV-7. Originally hosted by Don Bennetts and later by Madeline Burke, it was a children's series aired in an unusual 45-minute time-slot, though towards the end of its run it aired in a 60-minute time-slot. Running time excluding commercials is not known. It was made up of various segments, including "Youth Takes a Bow" and cartoons. In early 1958 it aired at 5:15PM, aired against Happy Show on GTV-9 and Children's TV Club on ABV-2. All three series consisted of a mix of local and imported segments.

References

External links
 

1957 Australian television series debuts
1960 Australian television series endings
Black-and-white Australian television shows
English-language television shows
Australian children's television series
Australian live television series